The A6102 is a 4 digit A road in South Yorkshire, England.

Route

It begins in the Greenhill area of Sheffield, at a junction with the A61 (at the Meadowhead Roundabout). The first segment of the road between Greenhill and Darnall is part of the Sheffield Outer Ring Road.

The road heads east as Bochum Parkway from the Meadowhead Roundabout, heading through Norton. The road becomes the Norton Avenue before entering Gleadless where it becomes Ridgeway Road. The road continues north through Hollinsend, passing the A6135 at Manor Top. The road then comes Prince of Wales Road, passing St Theresa's School before crossing over the Sheffield Parkway. The road then enters Darnall, before becoming Greenland Road. The road continuous north past Tinsley, passing a junction with the A631, before crossing the Sheffield & Tinsley Canal as Broughton Lane. Here the road passes a number of buildings including the Sheffield Arena, Valley Centertainment. The road briefly merges with the A6178 before crossing the River Don at Lower Don Valley. 

The road continues east through Grimesthorpe where it again crosses the A6135 near the Northern General Hospital at Fir Vale. The road continues east as Herries Road, heading through Norwood and Shirecliffe before meeting the A61 between Wadsley Bridge and Owlerton. The road briefly merges with the A61 and it enters Wadsley Bridge, before heading east as Leppings Lane, passing Hillsborough Stadium and crossing the River Don again before becoming Middlewood Road.

The road heads north again, following the course of the River Don, becoming Langsett Road at Oughtibridge. It then passes through Wharncliffe Side, becoming Manchester Road, connecting with the B6088 at Deepcar, and finally terminating at the A616 road.

Settlements on road
 Greenhill
 Norton
 Gleadless
 Manor Top
 Darnall
 Attercliffe
 Lower Don Valley
 Grimesthorpe
 Fir Vale
 Wadsley Bridge
 Oughtibridge
 Wharncliffe Side
 Deepcar

References

Roads in Yorkshire
Roads in Sheffield
Transport in South Yorkshire